Albert Ryno Broman (19 January 1917 – 6 June 1977) was an Australian rules footballer who played for the Richmond Football Club in the Victorian Football League (VFL).

Notes

External links 
		

1917 births
1977 deaths
Australian rules footballers from Melbourne
Richmond Football Club players
People from Caulfield, Victoria